Sylvia Albrecht (later Heckendorf, born 28 October 1962) is a German speed skater who competed for East Germany in the 1980 Winter Olympics.

She was born in East Berlin. In 1980 she won the bronze medal in the 1000 metres event. In the 1500 metres competition she finished ninth and in the 3000 metres contest she finished 14th.

References

1962 births
German female speed skaters
Speed skaters at the 1980 Winter Olympics
Olympic speed skaters of East Germany
Olympic medalists in speed skating
Medalists at the 1980 Winter Olympics
Olympic bronze medalists for East Germany
People from East Berlin
Living people
20th-century German women